Raffaella Lebboroni (born 10 June 1961) is an Italian actress.

Biography 
Born in Bologna, Lebboroni attended the Accademia dell'Antoniano, graduating in 1988. In 1992 she married the screenwriter and director Francesco Bruni, with the couple having two children.

A versatile and charismatic actress even in her supporting roles, Lebboroni is also remembered in Marco Risi's The Rubber Wall (1991) and Roberto Benigni's Life Is Beautiful (1997). She also starred in Paolo Virzì's August Vacation (1996) and in Carlo Virzì's  (2006).

Lebboroni has also starred in other films, such as The Early Bird Catches the Worm by Francesco Patierno, as well as Easy!

In 2019 she was part of the cast of The Traitor by Marco Bellocchio, and in 2020 she is in the film  by Bruni.

Filmography 

  (1989), blonde nurse
The Rubber Wall (1991), editorial journalist
Let's Not Keep in Touch (1994), library cashier
The True Life of Antonio H. (1994), teacher
La bella vita (1994), Marisa Cavedoni
August Vacation (1995), Betta
 (1997), Stefano's secretary
Life Is Beautiful (1997), Elena
The Early Bird Catches the Worm (2008), Marco's mother
Easy! (2011), teacher Di Biagio
 (2014), Nicoletta
 (2017), Laura
The Traitor (2019), judge
 (2020), doctor

References

External links
Studio Paolo Fidemi press agent

Italian film actresses
Actors from Bologna
Living people
Italian television actresses
20th-century Italian actresses
21st-century Italian actresses
1961 births